Sağlıklı is a village in Tarsus district of Mersin Province, Turkey. Sağlıklı  is famed  for the  Roman road starting point of which is near the village. The population of village is 1455  as of 2011.

References

Villages in Tarsus District